The dwarf spinyhead blenny (Acanthemblemaria paula) is a species of chaenopsid blenny found in coral reefs around Belize, in the western central Atlantic ocean. It can reach a maximum length of  SL.

References

paula
Vertebrates of Belize
dwarf spinyhead blenny